Dill is a surname, and may refer to:

 Augustus Granville Dill (1882—1956), American sociologist, educator and musician
 Bob Dill (1920–1991), American professional ice hockey player
 Clarence Dill (1884–1978), American politician
 Craig Dill (born 1944), American basketball player
 Cynthia Dill (born 1965), American lawyer and politician
 Danny Dill (1924–2008), American country music singer
 Dean Dill (died 2015), American magician
 Diana Douglas (1923–2015), née Dill, Bermudian-American actress
 Eric Dill (born 1981), American singer and songwriter
 Jacob William Dill, (1840–1920) Canadian merchant and political figure
 James Dill (1859–1937), Canadian politician
 John Dill (1881–1944), UK Second World War field marshal
 Lesley Dill (born 1950), American contemporary artist
 Ludwig Dill (1848–1940), German ship and landscape painter
 Max Dill (1876–1949), American vaudeville comedian
 Nathalia Dill (born 1986), Brazilian actress
 Roger Dill (born 1957),  Bermudan international cricket umpire
 Samuel Marcus Dill (1843–1924), Presbyterian minister

See also
 Dill